Hulatang, also known as hot pepper soup or spicy soup, is a kind of Chinese traditional soup created in Henan Province but became popularized in the cuisine of Shaanxi Province. Chinese immigrants have introduced it to the United States, where it is known as "spicy soup". It can be divided into two different versions in Henan: Xiaoyaozhen version (from a town near Zhoukou City) and Beiwudu version. As its name  literally the characters 'pepper' + 'capsicum/chilli' + 'soup'  implies, capsicum and black pepper are put into the broth made by beef soup.

History 
The exact origin of the soup cannot be accurately pinpointed now, but since the pepper, the main ingredient of the soup was not introduced to China until the Tang Dynasty. The soup was dubbed came into being after that, around Song Dynasty. Along the decades, the soup has evolved into a good many variations in different parts of China, according to local people's flavor and preferences, but the most basic and characteristic thing about the soup has never changed, that it is heavily seasoned with pepper and the texture of the soup is outstandingly thick and sticky. In addition to pepper, some herbs and flavourings such as ginger, aniseed and fennel are added into the boiling soup to improve the flavour and make it spicy and hot.

In modern China, especially for northerners, hulatang is a popular breakfast dish. A bowl of soup usually starts at four Yuan, but can be more expensive depending on the fame of the restaurant, quality and variety of its ingredients.

Variation

Beiwudu Hulatang 
The Hulatang in Beiwudu is boiled with dozens of spices, thus the color of the soup is dark. And it tastes very hot because of the black peppers. Another name of Beiwudu Hulatang is “eight treasures soup”, which means there are many ingredients in it. Usually the ingredients includes gluten, kelp, vermicelli, peanut, pepper and so on.

Xiaoyaozhen Hulatang 
The main difference between the soups is the usage of different spices. People can not tell what exact the proportional difference is between Beiwudu and Xiaoyaozhen. But the Xiaoyaozhen hot pepper soup is more prevailing as people in Xiaoyaozhen migrate to other place. Xiaoyaozhen used to be an important town because of the prosperity of canal transportation in Song Dynasty. So, the Hulatong spreads with those people who earn their living outside their hometown. And Xiaoyaozhen is one of the most important genre of Hulatang now.

Xi'an Hulatang with Meatballs 
Xi'an Hulatang also has a long history, it develops as people migrate between Shaanxi and Henan. People in Xi'an change some  ingredients in the soup. They put meatballs, potatoes, carrots, celery and many other vegetables into the soup which makes it suits the local flavor.  Xi'an Hulatang sometimes is served with chopped-up leavened flatbread.

Ingredients 
Cooked beef, beef soup, flour, vermicelli, kelp, spinach, pepper, ginger, salt, vinegar and sesame oil.

Value and influence in modern time 
The industrialization of producing the Hulatang brings a lot of benefits to normal people. For example, people in Xiaoyaozhen now pack the ingredients and spices up and sell them to the people all around the world through E-commerce platforms. To make the little packages, the demanded quantity of beef and mutton, as well as the quantity of workers in Xiaoyaozhen raised dramatically. The industrialization of Hulatang has provided lots of jobs for the residents. The government are also trying to help those people in poverty start up their own business of selling the soup.

See also

 List of Chinese soups
 List of soups

External links 

 HENAN Soup for the soul

References 

Chinese soups
Anise
Ginger dishes
Spicy foods